This is a list of the Wales national football team results from 2020 to present.

Fixtures and results

2020

2021

2022

2023

Notes

References

External links
 

Wales national football team results and fixtures
2020s in Wales